"Bottoms Up" is a single by Canadian rock band Nickelback as the second single from their seventh studio album, Here and Now.

A Billboard review of the song said that it was a "surprising return to [...] bawdy arena rock," but that it was also "amazingly monolithic" and "lack[ed] the slick melodies of the group's past hits."

Release
The song was made free for listening on the band's official website on September 22, 2011 and was released as an official single on September 26. It was made available for download on September 27. The official lyric video for "Bottoms Up" was released on YouTube on November 17.

Track listing

UK Track listing
"Bottoms Up" (Clean Edit)
"Bottoms Up" (Album Version)

US Track Listing
"Bottoms Up" (Clean Edit)

Charts

Year-end charts

References

2011 singles
2011 songs
Nickelback songs
Roadrunner Records singles
Songs written by Chad Kroeger
Songs written by Joey Moi
Song recordings produced by Joey Moi
Songs written by Mike Kroeger